Brian Callahan (born June 10, 1984) is an American football coach who is the offensive coordinator for the Cincinnati Bengals of the National Football League (NFL). He previously served as a quarterbacks coach for the Detroit Lions and Oakland Raiders. He also served as an offensive assistant for the Denver Broncos.

Coaching career

Denver Broncos
Brian Callahan began his NFL coaching career with the Denver Broncos in 2010 as a coaching assistant. He held various positions with the team through the 2015 NFL season. He was part of the Broncos staff when the team won Super Bowl 50 over the Carolina Panthers.

Detroit Lions
Callahan was hired by the Detroit Lions as quarterbacks coach in February 2016.

Oakland Raiders
Callahan was hired by the Oakland Raiders as quarterbacks coach in January 2018.

Cincinnati Bengals
Callahan was hired as the Cincinnati Bengals offensive coordinator on February 7, 2019.

Personal life

Callahan is the son of former Washington Redskins' interim head coach, and former Oakland Raiders head coach, Bill Callahan.

References

External links
Oakland Raiders bio

 Living people
1984 births
American football quarterbacks
Cincinnati Bengals coaches
Detroit Lions coaches
Denver Broncos coaches
National Football League offensive coordinators
Oakland Raiders coaches
People from Champaign, Illinois
Players of American football from Illinois
UCLA Bruins football players